Cloverton is an American contemporary Christian music and worship band from Manhattan, Kansas, United States. The band started out as Lance Stafford on lead vocals and keys with his twin brother Layne Stafford on background vocals and bass guitar, alongside, drummer Kirby LeMoine and lead guitarist Matt Brown. This would change in 2015 with Kirby LeMoine's and Matt Brown's departure from the band, and the addition of Rains Wall on drums and Conner Giles on guitar. The band released a successful single in 2011, "Take Me Into the Beautiful" with Fair Trade. This charted on various Christian music songs charts that Billboard publishes. The band would not get to release a full-fledged album with the label, so they crowdfunded their debut album, Patterns, in 2013. Their first Christmas extended play album, We Sing Joy, charted on three Billboard charts.  Their most recent album is Bloom, released September 8, 2017. Adding to their lineup in the summer/fall of 2017, Jon Moment and Thaddeus Johnson joined on bass and guitar. At the start of 2018, Cloverton signed with Red Letter Management.

Background
Cloverton is a Christian music band from Manhattan, Kansas, made up of Kirby LeMoine on drums, Lance Stafford on lead vocals and keys, Layne Stafford on bass guitar and background vocals and Matt Brown on lead guitar. Lance and Layne are twins; their father is a music teacher. At seven, the two started playing the piano and doing concerts.  Each member of the inaugural band came from a musical background. The group began performing together at a Manhattan church. In 2011, the band won "Rock the Camp" contest put on by TobyMac and were consequently rewarded with air time on K-LOVE, a spot to perform on the K-LOVE cruise, "Rock the Cruise", and some studio time. This allowed them to start their musical careers.

Music history
On January 31, 2009, the band independently released, Cloverton - EP. The band released, "Take Me Into the Beautiful", with Fair Trade Services, in 2011, to Christian radio success with chartings on Billboard'''s Christian Songs at No. 21 and Christian AC/CHR at No. 13. This was on their extended play, The End Is the Beginning, that was released by Fair Trade on February 9, 2012. Then, the band would crowdfunded, Patterns, but this failed to chart. Yet, it was reviewed by publications positively such as HM Magazine, Jesus Freak Hideout, and New Release Tuesday, getting a three and a half star review from HM Magazine and acquiring a four and a half star review by New Release Tuesday. After this, Cloverton would release independently a Christmas music extended play, We Sing Joy, which charted on three Billboard'' charts:  Christian Albums at No. 17, Heatseekers Albums at No. 3 and No. 28 on the Independent Albums chart. With this extended play, they released the single "A Hallelujah Christmas", that charted at No. 29 on the Christian Songs chart. In 2015 the band added drummer Rains Wall and guitarist Conner Giles because of the departure of Kirby LeMoine and Josh Svorinic, who left at the same time.

Discography

Albums

EPs

Singles

References

External links
 
 Alt Rock Live Interview

Musical groups established in 2008
Fair Trade Services artists